Gabriel Vasconcelos may refer to:

 Gabriel Vasconcelos (footballer, born 1996), Brazilian football forward
 Gabriel (footballer, born 1992) (Gabriel Vasconcelos Ferreira), Brazilian football goalkeeper